Petri Leskinen (born 9 June 1966) is a Finnish sailor. He competed at the 1992 Summer Olympics, the 1996 Summer Olympics, and the 2000 Summer Olympics.

References

External links
 

1966 births
Living people
Finnish male sailors (sport)
Olympic sailors of Finland
Sailors at the 1992 Summer Olympics – 470
Sailors at the 1996 Summer Olympics – 470
Sailors at the 2000 Summer Olympics – 470
Sportspeople from Vaasa